Dysauxes punctata is a moth of the family Erebidae. It was described by Johan Christian Fabricius in 1781. It is found in France, Portugal, Spain, Switzerland, Austria, Italy, Croatia, Bosnia and Herzegovina, North Macedonia, Greece, Turkey, Romania, Ukraine, Russia and North Africa.

Adults are on wing from May to mid-September in two generations per year.

The larvae are polyphagous on low-growing plants, including Taraxacum, Senecio, Plantago and Lactuca species.

References

External links

Lepiforum.de

Syntomini
Moths described in 1781
Moths of Europe
Moths of Asia
Taxa named by Johan Christian Fabricius